Jorge Bolaños (26 September 1943 – 24 May 1996) was an Ecuadorian footballer. He played in six matches for the Ecuador national football team from 1963 to 1967. He was also part of Ecuador's squad for the 1963 South American Championship.

References

1943 births
1996 deaths
Ecuadorian footballers
Ecuador international footballers
Association football midfielders
Sportspeople from Guayaquil